Charles Guyette (August 14, 1902 – June, 1976) was a pioneer of fetish style, the first person in the United States to produce and distribute fetish art, and regarded as the mail-order predecessor of Irving Klaw.  Later known as the "G-String King," he is best remembered for his bizarre (i.e., fetish) photographs, some of which featured sadomasochistic content.

Biography

Charles Guyette also worked as an innovative burlesque costumer and dealer in theatrical accessories, providing vintage corsets, opera gloves, custom-made fetish boots, and, most famously, G-strings. Employed by National Police Gazette editor, Edythe Farrell, he later provided costumes, high heel shoes and boots, and occasionally photographs for publisher Robert Harrison, known for such pin-up magazines as Wink, Titter, Beauty Parade, Whisper, and Eyeful. He was also important in early fetish community social circles of the day and in the careers of John Willie and Irving Klaw. Charles Guyette was a fetish fashion pioneer.

In 1935, Charles Guyette went to federal prison, becoming the first martyr of fetish art history. Later, he operated under a series of aliases and owned a costume shop on West 45th Street, in New York City. Largely uncredited in his lifetime, Charles Guyette influenced all the key fetish art innovators, including Irving Klaw, John Willie, Eric Stanton, and Leonard Burtman. The subject of a book tribute, Charles Guyette: Godfather of American Art,  he is also featured in the independent biopic on Wonder Woman creator William Moulton Marston. The film Professor Marston and the Wonder Women, written and directed by Angela Robinson, features Charles Guyette as the costumer for Wonder Woman's real-life inspiration, Olive Byrne. Guyette is played by actor JJ Feild.

See also 

 Irving Klaw
 John Willie
 Eric Stanton
 Gene Bilbrew
 Bettie Page
 Dita Von Teese
 Fetish fashion

References

Further reading
 Charles Guyette: Godfather of American Fetish Art  [*Cream Paper Edition*]  by Richard Pérez Seves. New York: FetHistory, 2019. 
 Eric Stanton & the History of the Bizarre Underground by Richard Pérez Seves. Atglen: Schiffer Publishing, 2018. 
Possibilities: The Photographs of John Willie edited by J.B. Rund. New York: Bélier Press, 2016. 
The Adventures of Sweet Gwendoline edited by J.B. Rund.(Second Edition, Revised & Enlarged) New York: Bélier Press, 1999. 
 Charles Guyette’s High Heeled Shoes: Photographs circa 1940 by George Monk. Amazon Digital Services (Kindle), 2014. 
 The Development of Sadomasochism as a Cultural Style in the Twentieth-Century United States (PhD dissertation) by Robert V. Bienvenu II. Indiana: Indiana University, 1998.

External links
 
 
 

1902 births
1976 deaths
BDSM people
Fetish photographers
Fetish artists
American erotic artists
Fetish clothing
Artists from New York City